Beach Road is a road located within the planning areas of Kallang, Rochor and the Downtown Core in Singapore.

The road starts at its junction with Crawford Street in Kallang in the north, runs in a generally southerly direction, enters the Downtown Core at its junction with Ophir Road, and ends at its junction with Stamford Road and St. Andrew's Road to the south.

As its name implies, Beach Road used to run along Singapore's southern coast, before land reclamation took place in the Kallang Basin area.

Landmarks

The prominent landmarks located along Beach Road include (from north to south):

South Beach Residences, Mixed Development with Grade A offices, hotel and residential component 
DUO, a contemporary twin-tower integrated development comprising residences, offices, a 5-star hotel and retail gallery
Golden Mile Complex and Golden Mile Tower
Destination Singapore Beach Road
Golden Mile Food Centre
Masjid Hajjah Fatimah
Saint John Headquarters
The Concourse
Parkroyal on Beach Road
The Plaza
The Gateway
Shaw Tower
Old Beach Road Police Station
South Beach
Raffles Hotel
Civilian War Memorial and War Memorial Park
Raffles City with Swissôtel The Stamford and Fairmont Singapore
Les Garçons Singapore

References

Victor R Savage, Brenda S A Yeoh (2004), Toponymics – A Study of Singapore Street Names, Eastern University Press, 
National Heritage Board (2002), Singapore's 100 Historic Places, Archipelago Press, 

Roads in Singapore
Kallang
Downtown Core (Singapore)
Rochor